Van Liew is a surname. Notable people with the surname include:

Brad Van Liew, American sailor
John Van Liew (1881–1959), American football coach

See also
Van Liew House, house in Somerset County, New Jersey, United States
Van Liew-Suydam House, house in Somerset County, New Jersey, United States
Van Liew Cemetery, cemetery in North Brunswick, New Jersey, United States

Surnames of Dutch origin